Ngawang Sungrab Thutob (1874–1952) was the third Taktra Rinpoche, (Wylie transliteration: sTag-brag, also Takdrak, Tagdrag, etc.) and regent of Tibet. As regent, he was responsible for raising and educating the 14th Dalai Lama, Tenzin Gyatso. In 1941, he succeeded the fifth Reting Rinpoche, Jamphel Yeshe Gyaltsen. The Reting Rinpoche later rebelled, was captured, and died imprisoned in the Potala Palace under mysterious circumstances.

State-controlled media in China claims that Thutob was responsible for the death of the 5th Reting Rinpoche, the teacher of 14th Dalai Lama and previous regent. They praise Jamphel Yeshe Gyaltsen as a patriot and devout Buddhist while calling Ngawang Sungrab Thutob as a "pro-Britain, pro-slavery separatist." Reting Rinpoche, regardless of his political leanings, will be remembered for discovering and enthroning the current, 14th Dalai Lama.

4th Taktra
In 1955 (or 1954), the 4th Taktra or Dagzhag (dharma name: Tenzin Geleg;) was born. He was recognized by the Dalai Lama in 1958 (or 1957). His name was given by 14th Dalai Lama. One or two years later, Dalai Lama fled to India.

Even though mass media in China evaluate Ngawang Sungrab Thutob negatively, 4th Taktra studied under the Chinese curriculum. He became a member of the 6th council of the Buddhist Association of China and the Vice President of Tibetan Sub-Association of Buddhist Association of China. He was quoted by Chinese press to have pejoratively labeled the Dalai Lama's supporters as the "Dalai Group" and said of them:

References

1952 deaths
1874 births
Regents in Tibet
Tibetan Buddhist monks
19th-century Tibetan people
20th-century Tibetan people